Sphenomorphus apalpebratus  is a species of skink found in India.

References

apalpebratus
Reptiles described in 2013
Taxa named by Aniruddha Datta-Roy
Taxa named by Indraneil Das
Taxa named by Aaron M. Bauer
Taxa named by Ronald Kupar Lyngdoh-Tron
Taxa named by Kota Praveen Karanth
Reptiles of India